Sangam is a village on the bank of Penna River and a Mandal in Nellore district in the state of Andhra Pradesh in India. The village of Chennavarappadu is nearby to the north.

References 

Villages in Nellore district